Opium is the debut studio album by German industrial band KMFDM, released in 1984 by Firstworld. It is one of only two KMFDM studio albums (the other being Nihil) that does not feature cover artwork by pop artist Brute!. There were only a handful of cassette copies of the album that were made.

Re-release
Opium was originally released in a limited run of cassettes and distributed through the Hamburg club scene. In the early 2000s, the original 8-track tapes were salvaged from a house, after surviving a fire and years of sitting in damp boxes. This had left them in a damaged state. Sascha Konietzko salvaged what information was still intact on the tapes, and then set about re-creating the tracks. This included reprogramming drums on some tracks with the original sounds, or sounds close to the original.

Sascha said that Opium would be the "missing link to 'Where did KMFDM even come from in the first place?'," which he said would be missed out if a listener began with What Do You Know, Deutschland?.

Track listing

Personnel
Sascha Konietzko – bass, vocals, guitar, synths, programming
Raymond Watts – vocals, programming
Ton Geist – additional guitars

References

1984 debut albums
KMFDM albums
Metropolis Records albums